Oberto Spinola was an Italian politician, a leader of the Republic of Genoa in the 13th century.

Biography 
Born in Genoa, he was a member of the Spinola Family. In 1270 he started a co-dictatorship with Oberto Doria. His son Corrado fought in the successful Battle of Meloria (1284) which destroyed the power of Pisa, then Genoa's main rival in the Mediterranean Sea together with Venice.

In 1275 he was capitano del popolo in Asti, and perhaps he took part in the battle of Roccavione of the same year, which marked the end of the Guelph-Angevine party south of Piedmont. He also directed the construction of  San Damiano d'Asti, a new city built by the Asti people. 

In 1291, Spinola started the construction of the Ducal Palace in Genoa.

See also
 Republic of Genoa
 House of Spinola

13th-century Genoese people
Spinola family
San Damiano d'Asti